This is a list of the 82 episodes of the U.S. sitcom The Flying Nun, originally broadcast on ABC-TV from September 7, 1967, to April 3, 1970.

The first two seasons are currently available on DVD by Sony Pictures Home Entertainment and Mill Creek Entertainment.

Series overview

Episodes

Season 1 (1967–68)

Season 2 (1968–69)

Season 3 (1969–70)

References

External links 

Lists of American sitcom episodes